The Emerson-Thoreau Medal is a literary prize awarded by the American Academy of Arts and Sciences to persons for their total literary achievement in the broad field of literature rather than for a specific work. Established in 1958, the prize is given at the discretion of the Council of the Academy on the recommendation of a nominating committee.

Recipients of the Emerson-Thoreau Medal
 1958 Robert Frost (poet)
 1959 Thomas Stearns Eliot (poet, critic, playwright) 
 1960 Henry Beston (naturalist, countryman, author) 
 1961 Samuel Eliot Morison (biographer, historian, scholar) 
 1962 Katherine Anne Porter (novelist) 
 1963 Mark Van Doren (poet, critic, teacher) 
 1965 Lewis Mumford (teacher, critic, philosopher)
 1966 Edmund Wilson (critic, man of letters) 
 1967 Joseph Wood Krutch (critic, biographer, naturalist) 
 1968 John Crowe Ransom (poet, critic, man of letters)
 1969 Hannah Arendt (social and political historian and philosopher) 
 1970 I. A. Richards (poet, critic, teacher of critics) 
 1975 Robert Penn Warren (novelist, poet, critic, teacher) 
 1977 Saul Bellow (teacher, novelist, critic of society) 
 1979 James T. Farrell (novelist, critic, essayist) 
 1989 Norman Mailer (novelist, critic, man of letters)
 2013 Philip Roth (novelist and memoirist)
 2016 Toni Morrison (novelist)
 2019 Margaret Atwood (poet)

References

American literary awards
Awards established in 1958
Literary awards honoring lifetime achievement
1958 establishments in Massachusetts